Otradnoye is a rural locality (a village) in Bryansky District, Bryansk Oblast, Russia. The population was 1,879 as of 2010. There are 73 streets.

Geography 
Otradnoye is located 10 km northeast of Glinishchevo (the district's administrative centre) by road. Bordovichi is the nearest rural locality.

References 

Rural localities in Bryansky District